Conostephium hortiorum is a species of flowering plant in the family Ericaceae and is endemic to the south-west of Western Australia. It is a spreading shrub with linear, narrowly elliptic or narrowly triangular sharply-pointed leaves and pendulous, spindle-shaped, straw-coloured and dark purple flowers.

Description
There is a sharply-pointed tip on the ends of the leaves. The flowers are more or less pendulous with overlapping bracts at the base.

Taxonomy and naming
Conostephium hortiorum was first formally described in 2013 by Michael Hislop in the journal Nuytsia from specimens collected by Fred and Jean Hort in Wandoo National Park. The specific epithet honours the collectors of the type specimens.

Distribution and habitat
Conostephium hortiorum in low  woodland only sandy soil on the eastern part of the Darling Range, mainly between the Great Southern and Brookton Highways in the Jarrah forest biogeographic region of south-western Western Australia.

Conservation status
This conostephium is listed as "not threatened" by the Western Australian Government Department of Biodiversity, Conservation and Attractions.

References

hortiorum
Eudicots of Western Australia
Ericales of Australia
Endemic flora of Western Australia
Plants described in 2013